Johann Carl Bodmer (11 February 1809 – 30 October 1893) was a Swiss-French printmaker, etcher, lithographer, zinc engraver, draughtsman, painter, illustrator and hunter. Known as Karl Bodmer in literature and paintings, as a Swiss and French citizen, his name was recorded as Johann Karl Bodmer and Jean-Charles Bodmer, respectively. After 1843, likely as a result of the birth of his son Charles-Henry Barbizon, he began to sign his works K Bodmer.

Karl Bodmer was well known in Germany for his watercolours, drawings and aquatints of cities and landscapes of the Rhine, Mosel and Lahn rivers. After he moved to France following his return from an expedition in the American West, he became a member of the Barbizon School, a French landscape painting group from the mid-19th century. He created many oil paintings with animal and landscape motifs, as well as wood engravings, drawings, and book illustrations. For his work, Bodmer was made a Knight in the French Legion of Honour in 1877.

He is best known in the United States as a painter who captured the American West of the 19th century. (See collection) He painted extremely accurate works of its inhabitants and landscape. He accompanied the German explorer Prince Maximilian zu Wied-Neuwied from 1832 through 1834 on his Missouri River expedition. Bodmer was hired as an artist by Maximilian in order to accompany his expedition and record images of cities, rivers, towns and peoples they saw along the way, including the many tribes of Native Americans along the Missouri River and in that region. Bodmer had 81 aquatints made from his work to illustrate Prince Maximilian's book entitled Maximilian Prince of Wied's Travels in the Interior of North America (1839-1841 in German/published in English translation in 1843-1844).

Early life
Johann Carl Bodmer was born on 11 February 1809 in Zurich, Switzerland. When he was thirteen, his mother’s brother, Johann Jakob Meier (a prominent engraver), became Bodmer's teacher. Meier was an artist, having studied under the well-known artists Heinrich Füssli and Gabriel Lory. Young Bodmer and his older brother, Rudolf, joined their uncle on artistic travels throughout their home country.

Missouri River expedition

By 1828, Bodmer had left his native Switzerland to work as a painter and engraver in the German city of Koblenz. It was there that he and his work came to the attention of Prinz Maximilian zu Wied-Neuwied. This German aristocrat had successfully led a scientific expedition to Brazil in 1815–1817. He decided to embark on another such venture, this time to North America and especially the American West. He hired Bodmer to accompany his expedition and make a visual record of the places and peoples encountered, through painting, drawings, etc. The aristocrat was known popularly to naturalists then and now as Prince Max.

After delays, Bodmer, in the company of Prince Max and David Dreidoppel, a huntsman and taxidermist, sailed for North America on 17 May 1832. In a letter of that date, Prince Max wrote to his brother that Bodmer "is a lively, very good man and companion, seems well educated, and is very pleasant and very suitable for me; I am glad I picked him. He makes no demands, and in diligence he is never lacking."

Arriving in Boston, Massachusetts, on 4 July, the three encountered hardships and delays caused largely by a cholera epidemic in the eastern states. It swept across the northern tier to Michigan via travelers on the waterways. The three men finally reached Pittsburgh, and started from there October 8 to travel west along the Ohio River. They arrived in Mt. Vernon, Indiana about midnight on 18 October. The next morning, the party made their way to New Harmony, Indiana.

Prince Max had planned to spend only a few days in New Harmony, but his stay "was prolonged by serious indisposition, nearly resembling cholera, to a four months' winter residence." The Prince devotes a chapter of his book of the expedition to New Harmony and its environs. He featured the work and personalities of Thomas Say and Charles-Alexandre Lesueur, two leading American naturalists. Lesueur was also a prolific artist.

Unlike the Prince and Dreidoppel, Bodmer escaped the illness. Alone, he left New Harmony at the end of December, and on 3 January 1833 caught a steamboat at Mt. Vernon, Indiana. He traveled down the Mississippi River to New Orleans, spending a week with Joseph Barrabino. This Italian-American naturalist was a friend of Say and Lesueur. (A fine pencil portrait of Barrabino, drawn by Lesueur, is preserved at the New Harmony Workingmen's Institute.)

In April 1833, Prince Max, Bodmer and Dreidoppel set out from St. Louis, Missouri on the 2,500-mile journey by steamboat and later keelboat up the Missouri River. They eventually traveled as far as Fort McKenzie (near present-day Fort Benton, Montana). After wintering at Fort Clark near the Mandan villages, they returned downriver the following spring, having spent more than a year on the Upper Missouri. Bodmer had extensively documented the journey with visual images, while Prince Max took copious notes for the book he intended to write.

Later life

After completing the expedition, Bodmer returned to Germany with Prince Maximilian, then traveled to France. In Paris he had many of his paintings from the expedition (81 in total) reproduced as aquatints. The Prince had these images incorporated into his book of the expedition, which was first published in German in Koblenz as Reise in das innere Nord-Amerika in den Jahren 1832 bis 1834 in two volumes from 1839 to 1841. Its English translation, Maximilian Prince of Wied’s Travels in the Interior of North America, during the years 1832–1834, was published in London in 1843-1844.

Bodmer moved permanently to Barbizon, France, and later became a French citizen. Recorded as Jean-Charles Bodmer, he went by "Charles Bodmer". He became a member of the Barbizon School, a group of painters who specialized in landscapes and works featuring animals. He worked in a variety of genres: painting, etching, wood engraving and illustration. Among his well-known works from this period was La Foret en Hiver (Interior of the forest in winter), exhibited at the Salon 1850 in Paris. It was painted at Fontainebleau forest. Bodmer also made an engraving of his painting, and reproductions were popular in the 1860s. Impressionist Claude Monet later painted the same trees, titling his painting The Bodmer Oak. This scene was the subject as well of numerous photographs in the 1870s.

His last years were difficult, as his illustrations became out of style, and he was affected by illness and poverty. Bodmer died in Paris, shortly after receiving his French citizenship. He is buried in Chailly-en Biere, at the entrance of the Fontainebleau forest which he loved so much. His three sons-Charles, Rodolphe and Henri, were colorful characters of the community of artists and poachers in Barbizon.

Although Bodmer is still relatively unknown in France, a first exhibition was dedicated to his works in September 2021 in the city of Barbizon.

Joslyn Art Museum
The Joslyn Art Museum in Omaha, Nebraska is home to the largest of three known collections of Bodmer's watercolors, drawings, and prints. Bodmer captured a challenging and dramatic landscape that was still unfamiliar to audiences in the eastern United States and Europe.

His portraits were the first accurate portrayal of western Indians in their homelands, and they are considered remarkable for their careful detail and sensitivity to the personalities of his sitters. To this day, Bodmer's work remains one of the most perceptive and compelling visual accounts of the American interior. Bodmer's work is recognised as among the most accurate painted images ever made of Native Americans, their culture and artifacts, and of the scenery of the pristine "Old West".

Gallery

Notes

See also
North America Native Museum

References
Maximilian zu Wied-Neuwied: Maximilian Prince of Wied’s Travels in the Interior of North America, during the years 1832–1834. Ackermann & Comp., London 1843–1844 (English translation)
Reuben Gold Thwaites: Early Western Travels, 1748–1846 (vol. 22–25), Arthur H. Clark Compagny, Cleveland-Ohio 1906.
Reuben Gold Thwaites: Early Western Travels, 1748–1846. AMS Press, New York 1966.
Philip Gilbert Hamerton: The Portfolio, Vol. 1-2. With Illustrations by Emilia Bodmer. London 1870.
Philip Gilbert Hamerton: Chapters on Animals.. With Twenty Illustrations by J. Veygrassat and Emilia Bodmer. Boston, Roberts Brothers, 1977.
David C. Hunt, William J. Orr, W. H. Goetzmann (editor): Karl Bodmer’s America. Joslyn Art Museum, Omaha (Nebraska) 1984. 
John C. Ewers: Views of Vanishing Frontier. Joslyn Art Museum, Omaha (Nebraska), 1984 + 1985
Marsha V. Gallagher: Karl Bodmer’s Eastern Views. Joslyn Art Museum, Omaha (Nebraska), 1996
Didier Lévêque, Eliane Foulquié (Ed.): Peindre les Indiens, l'Art de Karl Bodmer, Rosa Bonheur, Antoine Tzapoff, Paris,Les Amis de Rosa Bonheur, 2020, ISBN 978-2-9567368-3-7
Brandon K. Ruud (editor): Karl Bodmer’s North American Prints. Joslyn Art Museum, Omaha (Nebraska), 2004. .
W. Raymond Wood, Joseph C. Porter, David C. Hunt: Karl Bodmer’s Studio Art: The Newberry Library Bodmer Collection. University of Illinois Press. Urbana and Chicago 2002. 
Henri Beraldi: Les Graveurs du XIXe Siécle. Guide de l’amateur d’estampes modernes. 2. Band, Seite 137 bis 143. Librarie L. Conquet, Paris 1885.
Maximilian zu Wied-Neuwied: Verzeichnis der Reptilien welche auf einer Reise im nördlichen America beobachtet wurden. Bibliomania!, Salt Lake City c. 2006.  (hardback),  (unbound).
Maximilian zu Wied-Neuwied: Reise in das innere Nord-Amerika in den Jahren 1832 bis 1834, 2 vol., Koblenz, 1840-41. Reprint of L. Borowsky, München, 1979.
Nordamerika Native Museum Zürich: Karl Bodmer. A Swiss Artist in America 1809-1893. Ein Schweizer Künstler in Amerika. University of Chicago Press and Scheidegger & Spiess, Zürich 2009 (English and German).

External links

Collection at Old Book Art All 81 aquatint illustrations and map from Maximilian Prince of Wied’s Travels in the Interior of North America, during the years 1832–1834
Madelyn Dean Garrett: Karl Bodmer’s Aquatints: The changing Image. University of Utah 1990.
Karl Bodmer Sketchbook
Reise In Das Innere Nord-America color plates
Ten Dreams Galleries
Karl Bodmer Website
Karl Bodmer Aquatints

1809 births
1893 deaths
People from Zürich
19th-century Swiss painters
Swiss male painters
Artists of the American West
Swiss expatriates in the United States
Native Americans in art
19th-century Swiss male artists